The Funduq Staouniyyin (also spelled Foundouk Staouniyine, Fondouk Stawniyin; pronounced foon-dook sta-woo-nee-yeen) or Funduq al-Tetwaniyyin (also spelled Foundouk Tetouaniyine) is a historic funduq (caravanserai) in Fes el-Bali, the old city of Fes, Morocco.

Historical background 
The funduq is located next to the al-Qarawiyyin Mosque, facing its northeastern corner and close to the Mesbahiyya Madrasa. It was founded in the 14th century during the Marinid era, probably around the same time as the construction of the al-Attarine Madrasa by Sultan Abu Sa'id Uthman II, making it one of the oldest funduqs in Fes. 

Funduqs were a type of urban caravanserai in Morocco which served as an inn and commercial center for trade, providing services and accommodations for merchants and travelers from outside the city. Some funduqs were also occupied by artisans and manufacturers instead of merchants, but the Staouniyyin Funduq was solely for merchants. The name Staouniyyin or Tetwaniyyin means "people from Tetouan" (a city in northern Morocco), suggesting that merchants in Fes were historically grouped together by origin. The building was classified as a national monument in 1925. It was more recently restored, along with a number of other funduqs, by the ADER-Fes heritage preservation agency, and reopened in March 2019 as a cultural and commercial center for artisans, with some modern amenities added.

Architecture 
The funduq has a typical layout that matches other caravanserais in Morocco and in Nasrid Granada at the time, consisting of a courtyard surrounded by a multi-storied gallery that gives access to rooms arranged across its three floors. It has a usable floor area (after recent restorations) of 437 square metres. The galleries are supported by wooden lintels resting on square pillars, and are lined with wooden mashrabiya-like railings or parapets. The ground floor was most likely used for storage of animals and merchandise, and was the site of trading and commerce, while the upper floors were for sleeping accommodations. The building is also noted for its vestibule, which has a ceiling of carved and painted wood featuring geometric and floral motifs, as well as an Arabic inscription carved in Kufic script.

See also 

 Funduq al-Najjariyyin

References

External links 

 "Medieval inns restored as Moroccan craft markets", Associated Press Archive: contains footage of Funduq Staouniyyin after restoration (first part of video).

14th-century establishments in Morocco
Buildings and structures in Fez, Morocco
Marinid architecture
Caravanserais in Morocco